Azerbaijan is competing at the 2013 World Aquatics Championships in Barcelona, Spain between 19 July and 4 August 2013.

Diving

Azerbaijan qualified two quotas for the following diving events.

Men

Swimming

Azerbaijani swimmers achieved qualifying standards in the following events (up to a maximum of 2 swimmers in each event at the A-standard entry time, and 1 at the B-standard):

Men

Women

See also
 Azerbaijan at the 2013 UCI Road World Championships
 Azerbaijan at the 2013 World Championships in Athletics

References

External links
Barcelona 2013 Official Site

Nations at the 2013 World Aquatics Championships
2013 in Azerbaijani sport
Azerbaijan at the World Aquatics Championships